Loren Lippincott is a member of the Nebraska Legislature for District 34 from Central City, Nebraska. He was elected to the Nebraska Legislature on November 8, 2022.

Electoral history

References

Republican Party Nebraska state senators
21st-century American politicians
Living people
Year of birth missing (living people)